Miguelete or Colonia Miguelete is a village in the Colonia Department of southwestern Uruguay.

Geography

History
Miguelete was founded on 27 March 1909. Its status was elevated to "Pueblo" (village) category on 8 November 1942 por Ley No. 10.113.

There is a nearby creek of the same name.

Population
In 2011 Miguelete had a population of 999.
 
Source: Instituto Nacional de Estadística de Uruguay

Famous people
Santiago Urrutia, race driver

References

External links
INE map of Miguelete

Populated places in the Colonia Department